Esporte Clube Itaúna is a football club from the city of Itaúna, Minas Gerais, founded on 29 September 1929. It was founded as Itaúna Foot-Ball Club. The biggest triumph of the club was in 1964 when they beat Cruzeiro, with Tostão and Piazza in the lineup, 2:1 in a friendly match inaugurating their current home field Estádio Municipal José Flávio de Carvalho.

Current squad (selected)

Titles

Domestic
Campeonato Mineiro Módulo II runners-up: 2007.

Youth
Campeonato Mineiro U-15: 2007.

References

External links
 Official Website

 
Association football clubs established in 1929
Football clubs in Minas Gerais
1929 establishments in Brazil